Valter Bonča (born 17 March 1968) is a Slovenian former racing cyclist, who currently works as a directeur sportif for UCI Continental team . He competed at the 1988 Summer Olympics, representing Yugoslavia, and at the 1992 Summer Olympics, representing Slovenia.

Major results

1989
1st Overall Tour of Austria
1990
2nd Overall Vienna-Rabenstein-Gresten-Vienne
1991
2nd Overall Vienna-Rabenstein-Gresten-Vienne
1992
1st Overall Tour of Austria
1995
1st Overall Tour of Slovenia
1998
1st Stage 3 Tour of Slovenia
2000
 National Road Championships
1st  Time trial
2nd Road race
1st Stage 3 Tour of Rhodes
2nd Overall Sachsen Tour
1st Stage 5a
3rd Overall Tour de Bohemia
1st Stage 4
2002
3rd Jadranska Magistrala
2003
 National Road Championships
2nd Road race
2nd Time trial
2004
2nd Overall FBD Insurance Rás
1st Stage 1
2nd Giro d'Abruzzo
2005
2nd Time trial, National Road Championships
3rd Overall Paths of King Nikola

References

External links

1968 births
Living people
Slovenian male cyclists
People from Idrija
Cyclists at the 1988 Summer Olympics
Cyclists at the 1992 Summer Olympics
Olympic cyclists of Yugoslavia
Olympic cyclists of Slovenia